Hypolimnas aubergeri, the Côte d'Ivoire eggfly, is a butterfly in the family Nymphalidae. It is found in Guinea (the Nimba Mountains), eastern and central Ivory Coast (French: Côte d'Ivoire) and possibly Ghana. The habitat consists of forests.

Adults of both sexes mimic the black and white females of Acraea macaria and Acraea alcinoe.

References

Butterflies described in 1987
aubergeri